Weinstock is a Jewish and a German surname. Notable people with this surname include: 

 Arnold Weinstock (1924–2002), English businessman
 Bob Weinstock (1928–2006), founder of Prestige Records
 Carol Weinstock (1914–1971), American artist and educator
 Eleanor Frank Weinstock (born 1929), American former politician 
 Evan Weinstock (born 1991), American Olympic bobsledder
 George Weinstock (born  1949), American geneticist and microbiologist
 Gertrude Weinstock (1904–1985), American pianist
 Harris Weinstock (1854–1922), American businessman in Sacramento, California
 Herbert Weinstock (1905–1971), American music historian
 Izzy Weinstock (1913–1997), American football player
 Jack Weinstock (died 1969), American author and playwright 
 Judith Weinstock (born 1940), Israeli author
 Julian Weinstock (c. 1922–1993), American architect, real estate contractor and philanthropist from Los Angeles, California
 Maia Weinstock, American Wikipedia editor and Lego enthusiast
 Marcus Weinstock (born 1984), Swedish professional ice hockey player
 Sophia Petrillo, fictional character in TV series The Golden Girls and its spinoffs (full name: Sophia Angelo Spirelli Petrillo Weinstock)
 Sylvia Weinstock, American baker and cake-decorator
 Todd Weinstock, American guitarist and producer
 Ulf Weinstock (born 1952), ice hockey player who played for the Swedish national team

German-language surnames
Jewish surnames